Cham Borreh may refer to:

Cham Borreh, Fars
Cham Borreh, Lorestan